The Nk'Mip Desert Culture Centre (Okanagan ; conventional English pronunciation respelling "in-ka-meep") is an interpretive centre in Osoyoos, British Columbia, Canada,  It is owned and operated by the Osoyoos Indian Band and is approximately  north of the Canada–United States border.  It is situated on the edge of one of the most endangered ecosystems in Canada, the northernmost point of the Great American Desert which extends southward to the Sonoran Desert in Mexico.

The mission of the Centre is to exhibit the Okanagan Desert and the culture of the Okanagan people, and to promote conservation efforts for desert wildlife. The Centre has helped to create several spin-off businesses, including a landscaping business, a greenhouse for indigenous plants, a website development business, and a community arts and crafts market.

Exhibits
The Centre includes both indoor and outdoor exhibits and trails.  It is designed as an interactive learning environment with hands-on displays and two multi-media theatres. Exhibits include recreated examples of Aboriginal architecture structures:  a Tipi, Pit-house, and Sweat lodge.  The building is adjacent to a remnant of the desert, approximately 1,600 acres of which are being preserved as a conservation area.  Trailheads lead to 1.5 km of desert paths leading to reconstructed examples of First Nations buildings and interpretive sculptures.

The Centre's Rattlesnake Research Program receives support from Environment Canada to study Western Rattlesnakes and Great Basin Gopher snakes. The snakes are tracked and studied by biologists using radio telemetry.

Facilities
The Centre was designed by Hotson Bakker Boniface Haden architects + urbanists (now DIALOG), and completed in 2006. The design is both an homage to the traditional winter dwellings of the Okanagan peoples and a literal integration into the natural landscape with a contemporary architectural design. The building is constructed partially underground with the desert landscape extending over the building’s planted (green) roof and the front of the building is constructed of a rammed earth facade. This rammed earth wall is constructed of local soils, concrete, and colour additives. Its thickness and mass provide an insulating value of R-33 that help to provide a more stable indoor temperature than the large temperature swings of the surrounding desert climate. One architectural jurist described it: "the chameleon-like wall defines an ambiguous threshold between landscape and building."

Blue stain pine boards are used throughout the interior of the project. This wood, Lodgepole pine damaged by the Mountain pine beetle and blue stain fungus was harvested from local forests devastated by these invasive species.  The use of this material serves as a demonstration project of how this product, which is typically considered unsuitable for a finish material, can be utilized.

Awards
The Centre and its facility have been recognized with architectural, aboriginal, and regional awards:
 Governor General’s Medal in Architecture (2008)
 SAB Award, Sustainable Architecture & Building Magazine (2008)
 Royal Architectural Institute of Canada - Award of Excellence, Innovation in Architecture (2007)
 World Architecture Festival Award (2008) 
 Lieutenant-Governor’s of BC Medal of Excellence in Architecture (2007)
 Wood Design Green Award, Canadian Wood Council (2007)
 Awards for Excellence in Concrete Construction, Decorative Concrete Award, BC Ready–Mix Concrete Association (2007)
 Aboriginal Tourism BC “Power of Education Award" for the Rattlesnake Research Program
 Aboriginal Tourism BC "Inspirational Leadership Award"
 Okanagan Life Best of the Okanagan 2010 – Editors Choice Awards

References

External links
Osoyoos Indian Band 
Inspiration Green - photo gallery
Architecture-Buildings - photo gallery
Aboriginal Affairs and Northern Development Canada - Nk'Mip Desert Cultural Centre, April 2009.
Nk'Mip Centre Shimmers in Desert, The Tyee, 22 Oct 2008.
Hammer, Brent A. (2011) "Nk’Mip: Creating a “Taste of Place”," Totem: The University of Western Ontario Journal of Anthropology: Vol. 19: Iss. 1, Article 8.

Buildings and structures in British Columbia
Buildings and structures completed in 2006
Museums in British Columbia
First Nations museums in Canada
Natural history museums in Canada
Nature centres in British Columbia
Tourist attractions in the Okanagan
Okanagan
2006 establishments in British Columbia
Museums established in 2006